Jacqui Poncelet (born 1947), also known as Jacqueline Poncelet, is a Belgian artist. Poncelet began her art career as a ceramist in the 1970s and 1980s. In the 1980s her practice expanded to include painting, sculpture and public art.

Early life and education
Jacqui Poncelet was born in Liège, Belgium in 1947. From 1964 to 1969 she studied ceramics at Wolverhampton College of Art. From 1969 to 1972 she studied industrial ceramics at the Royal College of Art.

Art career

Her 2012 public artwork Wrapper can be seen at the Edgware Road (Circle line) Tube station in London. The work was unveiled in November 2012, a mosaic of 700 decorated panels of various patterns inspired by local history.

Her work is included in the collections of the Victoria and Albert Museum, the United Kingdom Crafts Council, the Tate Museum, the Art Institute of Chicago, the Museum of Modern Art, New York, and the British Council.

Personal life
Poncelet is married to the sculptor Richard Deacon.

References

20th-century Belgian women artists
21st-century Belgian women artists
1947 births
Artists from Liège
Women ceramists
Belgian ceramists
Living people